John Lyons (born 14 September 1943) is an English stage and screen actor. He played Detective Sergeant George Toolan in the long-running UK detective drama, A Touch of Frost (1992–2010) alongside David Jason.

Early life
Lyons was born in Whitechapel in 1943, the son of a dock worker and an office cleaner, and the youngest of three children. Aged six, he would help the local milkman deliver milk to the neighbouring block of flats before school. Leaving school at fifteen, Lyons became a labourer for British Rail at Paddington Station. An aspiring footballer, every Sunday morning, he and several hundred others would play football on Hackney Marshes. Aged 17, a member of his team happened to be a journalist who gave him a business card advertising a new drama school, East 15. Lyons auditioned and was accepted and spent three years at the drama school.

Career
Lyons' first acting job out of drama school was in Catch Hand. After this, he worked consistently in many popular television series including On the Buses, Man About the House, George and Mildred, Doctor in Charge and UFO. Lyons also had a prominent role playing Detective Sgt. Jim Huke in a 1976  episode of The Sweeney  and shortly after also appeared in the second film of the series.

Following appearances in Spooner's Patch, Bottle Boys and Upstairs Downstairs, in 1992, Lyons starred in the detective series A Touch of Frost opposite David Jason as DS George Toolan, a role he would play until the show's end in 2010. At the same time, Lyons also starred in Shameless, Spooks and Doctors, although he now mainly appears on stage.

Continuing his long and successful theatre career, in September 2005, Lyons joined the cast of the world's longest-running play, The Mousetrap, in London's West End. In 2015 and 2016, Lyons toured the UK in a stage adaptation of the BBC amateur detective series, Father Brown. He is, also, a regular performer in Pantomime throughout the country, and appeared in the role of "King Crumble" in Sleeping Beauty at the Marina Theatre, Lowestoft in December 2015. Lyons also appeared for the second time as special guest at a 43tv Retro TV Sweeney Meet in October 2016 in Hammersmith, London and gave an after dinner talk about his career in TV & Film.

In 2018, Lyons appeared in Ray Cooney's Caught in the Net and also in the new play The Eleventh Hour set in war time. For both the 2018/2019 and 2019/2020 Christmas season, Lyons appeared in pantomime at Bridlington Spa in Bridlington as "The King" in Jack and the Beanstalk and "Baron Hardup" in Cinderella respectively.

Personal life
Born a true Cockney from the East End of London, Lyons had to take elocution lessons every morning at drama school to remove his accent.

Filmography

Film

Television

References

External links 

John Lyons in The Sweeney - Bad Apple at 43tv - The Retro Forum

1943 births
Living people
English male stage actors
English male television actors
Male actors from London
People from Whitechapel